Basigonia is a genus of moths belonging to the subfamily Olethreutinae of the family Tortricidae.

Species
Basigonia anisoscia Diakonoff, 1983

See also
List of Tortricidae genera

References

External links
tortricidae.com

Olethreutini
Tortricidae genera
Taxa named by Alexey Diakonoff